Ogutu Okudo (born c. 1992), is a Kenyan oil and energy executive who serves as a Board Director at the National Oil Corporation of Kenya. She is also the Kenya country manager for SpringRock Group, an African upstream oil development company headquartered in Lagos, Nigeria. She concurrently serves as an energy consultant to the Kenya's Ministry of Petroleum and Mining. In addition, she is the Founder and CEO of the social enterprise, Women in Energy and Extractives Africa (WEX Africa).

Early life and education
Okudo was born in Kenya circa 1992. After attending local primary and secondary schools, she was admitted to the United States International University Africa, in Nairobi, the capital city of Kenya, where she graduated with a Bachelor of Arts degree in International Relations. She went on to study at the University of Aberdeen, in Scotland, where she graduated with a Master of Science degree in  Oil and Gas Enterprise Management.

Career
Since 2017 at the age of 25 years, she has worked as the country manager for SpringRock Energy, an international oilfield and servicing company.

She is also the founder and CEO of Women in Energy and Extractives Africa (WEX Africa), a Nairobi-based non-government organisation, with members in eight African countries and membership in excess of 3,500, of whom, 1,200 are in Kenya, as of 2020. The NGO encourages women to take up careers in the male-dominated oil and gas industry. When they get there, they are advised to take up careers in the most lucrative areas, including waste management, consultancy, oil transportation and security in oil mines. Members encourage girls to take  STEM courses in school and to seek careers in oil and gas.

Other considerations
She is a board member of the Association of Women in Extractives Kenya (AWEIK). Crans Montana Forum recognised her with the award of New Leader of Tomorrow, for her role in advocating for women in the energy sector. In 2020, Forbes Africa named her among the top 30 Africans under 30 years of age. Further on in 2020 Ogutu was appointed to the African Energy Chamber highest-level advisory committee to serve on local content matters and support capacity building across the continent.

See also
 Sanda Ojiambo
 Edwin Macharia

References

External links
Website of WEX Africa
Website of SpringRock Group

1992 births
Living people
21st-century Kenyan businesswomen
21st-century Kenyan businesspeople
Alumni of the University of Aberdeen
United States International University alumni